Allantonematidae is a family of insect-parasitic nematodes from the order Tylenchida. Allantonematid nematodes infect a variety of insects including beetles, butterflies, flies, thrips, ants, and more. For instance, the nematode Howardula aoronymphium parasitizes mushroom-feeding fruit flies, Formicitylenchus oregonensis parasitizes carpenter ants, and Metaparasitylenchus hypothenemi parasitizes a pest of coffee beans, the coffee berry borer.

Allantonematid nematodes infect insect larvae by piercing through the cuticle, after which they reside in the insect blood. There they develop through multiple juvenile stages before being shed out the anus or reproductive tracts. Mating typically occurs external to the insect host, after which mated female nematodes infect new hosts.

Systematics 
There are 2 subfamilies of Allantonematids that contain about 150 species in at least 16 genera. These include:

Subfamily 

 
 
 
 
 
 
 
 
 
 

 Subfamily 

 
 
 

 Subfamily not-yet classified
 

The systematics of the Allantonematidae are complicated due to various re-classifications of Allantonematid genera first classified by morphological characters. As a result, the family Allantonematidae is likely paraphyletic, evidenced by molecular study.

See also

 Howardula aoronymphium
 Metaparasitylenchus hypothenemi

References